The 2016 United States House of Representatives elections in West Virginia were held on November 8, 2016, to elect the three U.S. representatives from the state of West Virginia, one from each of the state's three congressional districts. The elections coincided with the 2016 U.S. presidential election, as well as other elections to the House of Representatives, elections to the United States Senate and various state and local elections.

The primaries were held on May 10.

District 1

The 1st district was located in northern West Virginia and consisted of Barbour, Brooke, Doddridge, Gilmer, Grant, Hancock, Harrison, Marion, Marshall, Mineral, Monongalia, Ohio, Pleasants, Preston, Ritchie, Taylor, Tucker, Tyler, Wetzel, and Wood counties, including the cities of Parkersburg, Morgantown, Wheeling, Weirton, Fairmont, and Clarksburg.

The incumbent was Republican David McKinley, who had represented the 1st district since 2011. McKinley expressed an interest in running for Governor of West Virginia, but announced that he would run for re-election to the U.S. House.

Former State Delegate Mike Manypenny won the Democratic nomination.

Democratic primary
Candidates
 Mike Manypenny, former State Delegate

Results

Republican primary
Candidates
 David McKinley, Incumbent

Results

General election

Results

District 2

The 2nd district was located in central West Virginia and consisted of Berkeley, Braxton, Calhoun, Clay, Hampshire, Hardy, Jackson, Jefferson, Kanawha,  Lewis, Morgan, Pendleton, Putnam, Randolph, Roane, Upshur, and Wirt counties, including the cities of Charleston and Martinsburg.

The incumbent was Republican Alex Mooney, who had represented the 2nd district since 2015. He defeated Marc Savitt in the Republican primary on May 10, 2016.

Mark Hunt, a former Democratic state representative, won the Democratic primary.

Democratic primary
Candidates
 Mark Hunt, former Democratic State Representative
 Cory Simpson
 Harvey D. Peyton
 Robert "Robin" Wilson, Jr.
 Tom Payne

Results

Republican primary
Candidates
 Alex Mooney, Incumbent
 Marc Savitt

Results

General election

Results

District 3

The 3rd district was located in southern West Virginia and consisted of Boone, Cabell, Fayette, Greenbrier,  Lincoln, Logan, Mason, McDowell, Mercer, Mingo, Monroe, Nicholas, Pocahontas, Raleigh, Summers, Wayne, Webster, and Wyoming counties, including the cities of Huntington and Beckley.

The incumbent was Republican Evan Jenkins, who had represented the 3rd district since 2015. Former United States Secret Service agent Matt Detch was the Democratic nominee.

Democratic primary
Candidates
 Matt Detch

Results

Republican primary
Candidates
 Evan Jenkins, incumbent

Results

General election

Results

References

External links
U.S. House elections in West Virginia, 2016 at Ballotpedia
Campaign contributions at OpenSecrets

West Virginia
2016
House